The 1966 Middle Tennessee Blue Raiders football team represented Middle Tennessee State University—as a member of the Ohio Valley Conference (OVC) during the 1966 NCAA College Division football season. Led by 20th-year head coach Charles M. Murphy, the Blue Raiders compiled a record an overall record of 7–3 with a mark of 5–2 in conference play, placing second in the OVC. The team's captains were L. Dotson and Jerry Smith.

Schedule

References

Middle Tennessee
Middle Tennessee Blue Raiders football seasons
Middle Tennessee Blue Raiders football